A theme park is a group of entertainment attractions, rides, and other events in a location for the enjoyment of large numbers of people.

Theme Park may also refer to:
 Theme Park (Alvin Curran album)
 Theme Park (BMX Bandits album)
 "Theme Park" (Lung Leg song)
 Theme Park (video game)

See also
 Amusement Park (disambiguation)